Oschatzia is a genus of flowering plants belonging to the family Apiaceae. It is also in the subfamily of Azorelloideae.

Its native range is south-eastern Australia, it is found in the states of New South Wales, Tasmania and Victoria.

The genus name of Oschatzia is in honour of Adolph Oschatz (1812–1857), and German doctor and botanist.He was also an inventor of microtomy. 
It was first described and published in Ann. Bot. Syst. Vol.1 on page 340 in 1848.

Known species
According to Kew:
Oschatzia cuneifolia 
Oschatzia saxifraga

References

Azorelloideae
Apiaceae genera
Plants described in 1848
Flora of New South Wales
Flora of Tasmania
Flora of Victoria (Australia)